William Mechen (8 January 1852 – 10 March 1880) was an English cricketer.  Mechen was a right-handed batsman.  He was born at Southwick, Sussex.

Mechen made his first-class debut for Sussex against Gloucestershire at County Ground, Hove in 1876.  He made three further first-class appearances for Sussex, the last of which came against Kent in 1879 at the Old County Ground, West Malling.  In his four first-class matches, he scored 43 runs at an average of 5.37, with a high score of 20.

He died at the village of his birth on 10 March 1880.

References

External links
William Mechen at ESPNcricinfo
William Mechen at CricketArchive

1852 births
1880 deaths
People from Southwick, West Sussex
English cricketers
Sussex cricketers